Red Bull Škoda Team is an Austrian private rally team that participated in the World Rally Championship in the  season. It was managed by BRR - Baumschlager Rallye & Racing and sponsored by the Red Bull brand. The team participated with four different drivers, using the Škoda Fabia WRC as the vehicle, in ten rounds on the calendar. Andreas Aigner's best result was a sixth place at Rallye Deutschland.

WRC Results

External links
Team profile at Juwra.com

World Rally Championship teams
Austrian auto racing teams
Red Bull sports teams
Auto racing teams established in 2006